Janette van Belen (born 29 May 1998) is a Dutch footballer who plays as a forward for ADO Den Haag in the Eredivisie.

Club career

International career

Personal life
van Belen was born in Leiden.

Honours

Club

International

References

Living people
Dutch women's footballers
Eredivisie (women) players
1998 births
Footballers from Leiden
Women's association football forwards
ADO Den Haag (women) players